The 2010 FIA WTCC Race of Spain (formally the 2010 FIA WTCC DHL Race of Spain) was the ninth round of the 2010 World Touring Car Championship season and the sixth running of the FIA WTCC Race of Spain. It was held at the Circuit Ricardo Tormo near Valencia, Spain on 19 September 2010. The two races were won by SR-Sport drivers Gabriele Tarquini and Tiago Monteiro.

Background
Coming into the final European round of the season, Chevrolet RML driver Yvan Muller was leading the drivers' championship and Sergio Hernández was leading the Yokohama Independents' Trophy.

Marc Carol joined the field in a SEAT Customers Technology run SEAT León 2.0 TFSI. Carol had last raced in the World Touring Car Championship at the 2005 FIA WTCC Race of Spain. Fabio Fabiani didn't return after the Race of Germany.

Report

Free practice
BMW Team RBM's Augusto Farfus was fastest in the opening practice session on Saturday morning, beating the lead Chevrolet of Alain Menu. Gabriele Tarquini was the leading SEAT in fifth while Carol was the quickest independent driver on his return to the WTCC.

SR–Sport's Tom Coronel set the pace in the final practice session, edging out Menu by a tenth of a second. Kristian Poulsen was both the leading independent and BMW driver in seventh.

Qualifying
Tarquini took pole position in qualifying for the first race on Sunday, beating the Chevrolet of Robert Huff. Fredy Barth had been the fastest driver in the first element of qualifying, beating the works Chevrolet drivers. Norbert Michelisz suffered an engine failure during Q1, finishing thirteenth while Franz Engstler ended his session in the gravel after setting a time good enough for fourteenth. Andy Priaulx narrowly made it through to Q2, finishing the session tenth at the expense of Michel Nykjær.

Tarquini set his pole time early on while later fast laps from Huff and Muller saw them finish second and third ahead of Menu who was hampered with gearbox problems. Tiago Monteiro and Coronel, who would take a ten place grid penalty for an unscheduled engine change. Jordi Gené, Barth and the works BMW pair of Priaulx and Farfus completed the top ten.

Warm-Up
Michelisz led Sunday morning's warm–up session with pole sitter Tarquini half a second behind.

Race One
Tarquini led away from pole position while further down, Priaulx moved up from ninth to sixth. Muller easily got ahead of Huff to take second place in opening laps while Barth and Farfus were battling over who would start on the front row for race two. Menu had dropped down the order to claim the reversed grid pole as Barth repeatedly tapped Farfus' rear bumper. The BMW eventually went wide, giving sevenths place to Barth. At the front, Tarquini took the win with Muller second and Huff third. Gené was fourth, Priaulx finished fifth and Monteiro was sixth. Poulsen was twelfth and won the independents' class.

Race Two
Menu started on pole position and was followed by Barth, the two were then passed up each side by Monteiro on the outside and Priaulx on the inside. Priaulx and Menu then collided, allowing Monteiro to assume the lead and Barth took second place. Priaulx attempted another move on Menu at turn three but the Chevrolet took the normal line through the corner, the pair collided and Menu spun. Priaulx was delayed but Muller took the opportunity to pass both of them and take third, he then took second from Barth when the Swiss SEAT driver slowed with a puncture. Priaulx was left to battle with Tarquini for third, with Tarquini coming out on top. At the end of the race, Monteiro took the win with Muller second and Tarquini third. Poulsen was the Yokohama Trophy winner.

Results

Qualifying

Race 1

Bold denotes Fastest lap.

Race 2

Bold denotes Fastest lap.

Standings after the event

Drivers' Championship standings

Yokohama Independents' Trophy standings

Manufacturers' Championship standings

 Note: Only the top five positions are included for both sets of drivers' standings.

References

Results Booklet PDF at MST Systems

External links
World Touring Car Championship official website

Spain
FIA WTCC Race of Spain